The 1926–27 NCAA men's basketball season began in December 1926, progressed through the regular season and conference tournaments, and concluded in March 1927.

Season headlines 

 In February 1943, the Helms Athletic Foundation retroactively selected Notre Dame as its national champion for the 1926–27 season.
 In 1995, the Premo-Porretta Power Poll retroactively selected California as its national champion for the 1926–27 season.

Regular season

Conference winners and tournaments

Statistical leaders

Awards

Helms College Basketball All-Americans 

The practice of selecting a Consensus All-American Team did not begin until the 1928–29 season. The Helms Athletic Foundation later retroactively selected a list of All-Americans for the 1926–27 season.

Major player of the year awards 

 Helms Player of the Year: Vic Hanson, Syracuse (retroactive selection in 1944)

Coaching changes 

A number of teams changed coaches during the season and after it ended.

References